Horsens is a city on the east coast of Jutland region of Denmark. It is the seat of the Horsens municipality. The city's population is 61,074 (1 January 2022) and the municipality's population is 94,443, making it the 8th largest city in Denmark.

Horsens is best known for its culture and entertainment events. Horsens New Theatre is a cultural centre which holds over 200 events annually. It has managed to draw major names such as Bob Dylan, Madonna, One Direction, Paul McCartney and The Rolling Stones.



Geography
Horsens lies at the end of Horsens Fjord in eastern Jutland. The city is surrounded by typical moraine landscape with low hills and valleys created by glaciers during the last ice ages.

History
It is believed the name Horsens derives from the old Danish words hors (horse) and næs (naze, headland). The name Horsens has been in use since the 12th century.

The earliest traces of a city are remains of a pagan burial site and houses dating back to the 10th century. In the 12th century, the kings Sweyn III and Valdemar I issued coins in the city. In the 13th century the city got its own legal code.

Excavations have shown that the city was expanded around 1300, with a moat going around the city and its harbour. Industrialization started from the middle of the 19th century.  The population rose dramatically when people from the countryside moved to the city to work in the factories. The first Danish iron foundry outside of Copenhagen was opened as well as tobacco and textile factories.

Economy
The city is currently undergoing a positive development with new industry moving to Horsens, or expanding their activities already in Horsens. A lot of electronics and graphical companies are based there. Horsens also has the only Industrial Museum in Denmark. The city is also home to VIA University College which brings a lot of international students to move to this town.

Culture

In recent years, much effort has been made to expand and improve cultural events. Several internationally known artists, such as Madonna, Metallica, Iron Maiden, Joe Cocker, Elton John, The Beach Boys, Bob Dylan, Tom Jones, Bryan Adams, David Bowie, José Carreras, Helmut Lotti, Westlife, R.E.M., Paul McCartney, Robbie Williams, The Rolling Stones, Dolly Parton, AC/DC, U2, Rammstein and Snow Patrol have performed, or have performances planned in Horsens.

Metallica has performed several times in Horsens.

Hard Rock/Heavy Metal band Pretty Maids is from Horsens.

One of the largest cultural events in Denmark is the annual European Medieval Festival on the last Friday and Saturday in August. The town centre of Horsens is transformed into the largest medieval market town in Northern Europe with activities and entertainment for families and children of all ages.

Every March, Horsens hosts a Crime Fiction Festival. The Crime Festival – in Danish called Krimimessen – is an event for literary crime, mysteries and thrillers. The Crime Festival is organized by Horsens Public Library. Every year, many well-known crime writers visit Horsens.

The city is home to Horsens Industrimuseum, a museum showing the history of the industrial society. The museum shows technological development and developments in living conditions for workers.

European route E45 runs by the city of Horsens.

Peter Sørensen from the Social Democrats is mayor of Horsens.

Vitus Bering, the famous Russian Navy captain, was born here.

Education

The largest educational institution in Horsens is VIA University College, which offers a wide range of engineering, technical and business programmes for Danish and International students. In the summer of 2020, VIA University College accepted 1066 new students. That was 2.1% more than the number of students that were accepted to the university the year before.

Sport
Horsens is the home to professional football club AC Horsens who play in the Danish Superliga. Their home ground is the 10,400 capacity CASA Arena Horsens.

It was planned that in 2015, the CASA Arena would host Motorcycle speedway when it would hold the Speedway Grand Prix of Denmark for the first time, taking over as host from the Parken Stadium in Copenhagen which had held the Speedway Grand Prix event from 2003 to 2014.

Horsens is also home to professional basketball team Horsens IC who play in Basketligaen. The team plays at Forum Horsens which has a capacity of 3,300. The team has won the league 6 times most recently in 2014–15 and 2015–16 as well as winning the Danish Men's Basketball Cup 3 times most recently in the 2014–15 season.

Transportation

Rail

Horsens is served by Horsens railway station. It is located on the Fredericia-Aarhus railway line and offers direct InterCity services to Copenhagen, Hamburg, Aarhus and Aalborg as well as regional train services to Fredericia and Aarhus.

Prison
From 1853 to 2006 the city housed the Horsens Statsfængsel prison, which held prisoners serving longer sentences. A notable prisoner was former minister of justice Peter Adler Alberti.

The last execution in peacetime in Denmark happened in the prison in 1892 when Jens Nielsen was decapitated in the courtyard.

Carl August Lorentzen was a safe cracker who became famous for his escape from the prison in 1949 when he dug a tunnel from his cell and out to freedom. When the guards discovered he was missing, they found a note from him with the words "Where there is a will there is a way". Lorentzen was captured a few days later on a nearby farm.

The old run-down buildings were not fit for a modern prison. In 2006 the prison was closed and the newly built State Prison of East Jutland was opened. The new prison, which is placed near Horsens, held the mass murderer Peter Lundin for a period.

Since its closure as a prison, Horsens Statsfængsel has housed a crime and prison museum, and conference and business facilities. The prison grounds have been used for concerts. It was considered as the venue of the Eurovision Song Contest 2014, along with two other cities in Denmark.

VisitHorsens (the local tourist office) moved to the Prison in 2013 and in 2015 a hotel called SleepIn has opened in the Prison.

Notable people from Horsens

Public thinking and politics 
 Peder Skram (ca.1500-1581) a Danish Admiral and naval hero.
 Jens Bang (ca.1575–1644) a wealthy Danish merchant, built Jens Bang's House in Aalborg
 Hans Svane (1606–1668) a Danish statesman and ecclesiastic. 
 Vitus Bering (1681–1741), naval officer and explorer, the Bering Strait was named after him.
 Poul Vendelbo Løvenørn (1686–1740) a Danish military officer, diplomat and landowner
 Ove Høegh-Guldberg (1731–1808) statesman and de facto Prime Minister of Denmark
 Catherine Antonovna of Brunswick (1741–1807) & Elizabeth Antonovna of Brunswick (1743–1782) daughters of Duke Anthony Ulrich of Brunswick lived under house arrest in Horsens
 Adelbert Heinrich Graf von Baudissin (1820-1871), writer
 Hedevig Rosing (1827–1913), author, educator, school founder; first woman to teach in Copenhagen's public schools
 Andreas Bang-Haas (1846–1925) a Danish entomologist and insect dealer
 Hans G. Jensen (1856–1922) a Norwegian trade unionist, politician and tailor
 Ellen Broe (1900–1994) a Danish nurse who established educational and training initiatives 
 Lilli Gyldenkilde (1936–2003) a Danish politician, a member of the Folketing and an MEP
 Lars Hedegaard (born 1942) a Danish historian, journalist and author
 Peter Landrock (born 1948) a Danish cryptographer and mathematician
  Jens Kehlet Nørskov (born 1952), professor
 Flemming Besenbacher (born 1952), professor
 Jan Trøjborg (1955–2012), politician, Mayor of Horsens 2005–2012, served in the Folketing 1987–2005, was Govt. Minister 
 Jens Nielsen (born 1962), professor
 Anders Samuelsen (born 1967) a Danish politician and Minister of Foreign Affairs (Denmark) 
 Peter Fibiger Bang (born 1973) a Danish comparative historian

The Arts 

 Anton Dorph (1831–1914) a Danish painter who painted altarpieces and fishermen
 Frederikke Federspiel (1839–1913) first female pro photographer, ran a photo. studio in Aalborg
 Ludovica Thornam (1853–1896) a Danish portrait and genre painter
 Alfred Schmidt (1858–1938) a Danish illustrator, caricaturist and painter
 Anton Rosen (1859–1928) a Danish architect, furniture designer and decorative artist
 Albert Edvard Wang (1864-1930) a Danish landscape painter
 Anna Bloch (1868–1953) a Danish actress
 Emanuel Gregers (1881–1957) a Danish actor, screenwriter and film director
 Christian Arhoff (1893–1973) a Danish stage and film actor and member of National Socialist Workers' Party of Denmark
 Knud Holmboe (1902–1931) a Danish journalist, author and explorer
 Vagn Holmboe (1909–1996), a Danish composer and teacher who wrote in a neo-classical style
 Poul Borum (1934–1996) writer, poet and critic, was raised in Horsens
 Manon Rasmussen (born 1951) a Danish costume designer
 Kristian Halken (born 1955), film actor
 Søren Sætter-Lassen (born 1955) a Danish stage, film and television actor
 Michael Kvium (born 1955) a Danish multifaceted artist
 Anne Louise Hassing (born 1967), actress
 Emmy Thornam (1852–1935), flower painter and writer
 Ludovica Thornam (1853–1896), portrait and genre painter
 Barbara Zatler (1980-2019) an actress, TV personality, model and comedian
 Pretty Maids (formed 1981) a Danish hard rock/heavy metal band from Horsens 
 Peter Bjørnskov (born 1981) a Danish singer, songwriter and record producer

Sport 

 Ernst Schultz (1879 – drowned, 1906) sprinter, bronze medallist at the 1900 Summer Olympics
 Thyge Petersen (1902–1964) an amateur boxer, silver medallist at the 1924 Summer Olympics
 Helge Muxoll Schrøder (1924–2012) rower, team silver medallist at the 1948 Summer Olympics
 Bent Schmidt-Hansen (1946–2013) a footballer, over 350 club caps and 8 for Denmark 
 Anja Hansen (born 1973) handball player, team gold medallist at the 1996 Summer Olympics
 Anne Dot Eggers Nielsen (born 1975) a former footballer, won 118 caps for the Danish national women's team
 Søren Jochumsen (born 1976) a retired football goalkeeper, 521 caps with AC Horsens
 Brian Priske (born 1977) retired footballer, 468 club caps and 24 for Denmark
 Karen Brødsgaard (born 1978) a Danish former handball player, twice team gold medallist at the 2000 and 2004 Summer Olympics
 Simon Kjær (born 1989), footballer over 390 club caps and captain of Denmark with 95 caps
 Anne-Marie Rindom (born 1991) a Danish sailor, gold medallist at the 2020 Summer Olympics
 Alexandra Bøje (born 1999) a Danish badminton player
 Jeppe Kjær (born 2004) a danish footballer who plays in Ajax

International relations

Twin towns – sister cities
Horsens is twinned with:

See also
 Chronicle of the Expulsion of the Grayfriars#Chapter 15 Concerning the Friary at Horsens

References

External links

 
The Municipality of Horsens (In Danish and English)
Horsens city official tourist website (In Danish/English)
Horsens New Theatre (In Danish)
The European Medieval Festival in Horsens (In Danish and English)
Denmark's Industrial Museum (In Danish, English and German)
Krimimessen (In Danish)
Vikings in Horsens
Instagram Photos of Horsens

 
Municipal seats of the Central Denmark Region
Municipal seats of Denmark
Cities and towns in the Central Denmark Region
Horsens Municipality